Ciren Cuomu (born 27 August 1997) is a Chinese long-distance runner. In 2019, she competed in the women's marathon at the 2019 World Athletics Championships held in Doha, Qatar. She finished in 33rd place.

In 2017, she competed in the senior women's race at the 2017 IAAF World Cross Country Championships held in Kampala, Uganda. She finished in 72nd place.

References

External links 
 

Living people
1997 births
Place of birth missing (living people)
Chinese female long-distance runners
Chinese female marathon runners
Chinese female cross country runners
World Athletics Championships athletes for China